Brooke Bundy is an American film and television actress.

Early years
As a teenager, Bundy was a model in New York before she went to Hollywood on vacation and remained there to become an actress. While in New York, she attended the Professional Children's School.

Acting career

Movie
She is perhaps best known for her role as Elaine Parker in the 1987 hit horror film A Nightmare on Elm Street 3: Dream Warriors and its sequel, A Nightmare on Elm Street 4: The Dream Master (1988). Bundy appeared in Daniel Farrands' documentary film, Never Sleep Again: The Elm Street Legacy.

Television

Bundy had an early role in the second season of Barnaby Jones; episode titled, "Death Leap"  (09/23/1973). She had two long-running roles on the soap opera Days of Our Lives as Rebecca North (1975–77) and General Hospital as Diana Maynard Taylor, RN (1977–81). She has made guest appearances on a variety of television shows including The Big Valley, Mr. Novak, Daniel Boone, Lassie (playing Terri Young in  season 12, episode 10 "In the Midst of Splendor"), Lancer, Charlie's Angels, The Brady Bunch, The Partridge Family, Medical Center, Gunsmoke, Bonanza, Cannon (season four, episode 17 "The Killer on the Hill"), Rawhide, The Virginian, Mission: Impossible (season four, episodes three and four "The Controllers" Part One, Part Two), Mannix, The Mod Squad, McMillan and Wife, Voyage to the Bottom of the Sea, Moonlighting, Gidget, Land of the Lost, Star Trek: The Next Generation (season one, episode "The Naked Now"), Starman TV series (season one, episode 20 - "Starscape" part one), My Three Sons, and The Donna Reed Show. As a stock actress for Jack Webb's production company Mark VII Limited, she appeared as several different characters in shows such as Emergency! and Sierra.

TV and filmography
#StopTheNightmare (2020)
Never Sleep Again: The Elm Street Legacy (2010)
Without Her Consent (1990)
Night Visitor (1989)
Survival Quest (1989)
A Nightmare on Elm Street 4: The Dream Master (1988)
A Nightmare on Elm Street 3: Dream Warriors (1987)
Star Trek: The Next Generation season one, episode two: "The Naked Now" (1987)
Starman (1986) season one, episode 20 - "Starscape" Part 1
Stewardess School (1986)
Explorers (1985)
Father Murphy (1982) episode: "The First Miracle", Parts 1 and 2
The Man in the Santa Claus Suit (1979) (TV movie)
Crash (1978) (TV movie)
CHiPs (TV Series)  (1977) episode: "Pilot"
Wonder Woman (1977) episode: "The Return of Wonder Woman"
McMillan and Wife (1976) episode: "Greed"
Moonlighting (1986) episode: "Yours, Very Deadly"
Police Story (1975) episode: "War Games"
Land of the Lost (1975) episode: "The Zarn" 
Cannon (1975) episode: "Killer on the Hill"
Sierra (1974) episode: "Taking Cody Winslow"
Emergency! (1974) episode: "Communication Gaffe"
Medical Center (1974) episode: "Midwife"
The Magician (1974) episode: "The Illusion of the Queen's Gambit"
The Brady Bunch (1974) episode: "Kelly's Kids"
The Partridge Family (1973) episode: "Heartbreak Keith"
Owen Marshall: Counselor at Law (1973) episodes: "The Camerons Are a Special Clan", "Some People in a Park"
Police Story (1973) episode: "Line of Fire"
The Mod Squad (1973) episode: "The Night Holds Terror"
Emergency! (1973) episode: "Alley Cat"
Night Gallery (1973) episode: "Death on a Barge"
Barnaby Jones (1973) Ms. Phillips "Death Leap"
Search (1972) episode:  "Moment of Madness"
Longstreet (1972) episode: "Sad Songs and Other Conversations" 
Emergency! (1972) episode: "Peace Pipe"
The Rookies (TV series)  (1972) episode: "A Bloody Shade of Blue"
The Mod Squad (1971) season four, episode three: "Home Is the Street" 
Cannon (1971) episode: "Dead Pigeon"
Medical Center (1971) episode: "Countdown"
Mannix (1971) episode: "To Save a Dead Man"
Lassie (1971) episode: "The Awakening"
My Three Sons (1971) episode: "Debbie"
Along Came a Spider (1970) (TV movie)
Dan August (1970) episode: "Epitaph for a Swinger"
The Interns (1970) episode: " An Afternoon in the Fall"
The Mod Squad (1970) episode: "Fever"
Judd for the Defense (1969) episode: "Borderline Girl"
Lancer (1969) episodes: "The Wedding",  "Cut the Wolf Loose"
Mission Impossible (1969) episode: The Controllers"
The Gay Deceivers (1969)
Medical Center (1969) episode: "Thousands and Thousands of Miles"
The Young Runaways (1968)
The Mod Squad (1968) pilot and first episode: "The Teeth of the Barracuda"
The F.B.I. (1968) episode: "Ring of Steel" as Kim
Firecreek (1968)
Daniel Boone (1968)  episode: "Be Thankful For The Fickleness of Women"
Dragnet (1968) episode: "The Little Victim"
Mannix (1967) episode: "Warning: Live Blueberries"
Judd for the Defense (1967) episode: "A Civil Case of Murder"
Occasional Wife (1967) episode: "The New Secretary"
Bonanza (1967) episode: "Judgment at Olympus" as Mary Elizabeth Fuller
The Big Valley (1967) episode: "The Stallion"
The Virginian (1966) episode: "The Mark of a Man"
Gunsmoke (1966) episode: "Sweet Billy, Singer of Songs" as Orabelle Beal
Run for Your Life (1966) episode: "The Committee for the 25th"
Lassie (1965) episode: "In the Midst of Splendor"
Ben Casey (1966) episode: "Lullaby for a Wind-Up Toy"
Voyage to the Bottom of the Sea (1965) episode: "The Cyborg"
Gidget (1965) episode: "Gidget's Foreign Policy"
Burke's Law (1965) episode: "Peace, It's a Gasser"
Bonanza (1965) episode: "The Debt" as Annie Kane
Rawhide (1965) episode: "The Winter Soldier"
Mr. Novak(1964) episodes: "One Monday Afternoon", "The Song of Songs"
Dr. Kildare (1964) episode: "The Child Between"
The Virginian (1964) episode: "The Secret of Brynmar Hall"
The Man from U.N.C.L.E (1964) episode: "The Deadly Games Affair"
Route 66 (1963) episode: "The Stone Guest"
Wagon Train (1963) episode: "The Bleecker Story"
Gunsmoke (1963) episode: "The Magician"
Mr. Novak (1963) episode: "X Is the Unknown Factor"
My Three Sons (1963) episodes: "Robbie Wins His Letter", "High on the Hog", "A Car of His Own"
The Adventures of Ozzie & Harriet (1963) episode: "Torn Dress"
The Donna Reed Show (1962)

References

External links

 

American film actresses
American soap opera actresses
American television actresses
Living people
Actresses from New York City
Actresses from Los Angeles
20th-century American actresses
21st-century American women
Year of birth missing (living people)